The 2014 Open de Suède Vårgårda was the nine edition of the Open de Suède Vårgårda women's road race.

Results
Source:

World Cup standings
Standings after 8 of 9 2014 UCI Women's Road World Cup races.

Individuals

Team: 
Mountain: Vera Koedooder
Sprint: Iris Slappendel
Youth: Elena Cecchini

References

External links

2014 in Swedish sport
2014 UCI Women's Road World Cup
Open de Suède Vårgårda